Charles Bowman may refer to:

 Charles Calvin Bowman (1852–1941), U.S. Representative from Pennsylvania
 Charles F. Bowman (1919–2009), American businessman
 Charles Lewis Bowman (1890–1971), American architect
 Charles Martin Bowman (1863–1932), Ontario businessman and political figure
 Charles Sumner Bowman (1873–?), African American architect
 Chuck Bowman (born 1937), American actor, director and writer
 Charles Bowman (Lord Mayor of London) (born 1961), Lord Mayor of London